Bryan McGan (1848 – 9 July 1894) was an Australian cricketer. He played three first-class cricket matches for Victoria between 1871 and 1875.

See also
 List of Victoria first-class cricketers

References

1848 births
1894 deaths
Australian cricketers
Victoria cricketers
Cricketers from Melbourne